Bertil Ebbe Gustaf Albertsson (1 September 1921 – 3 March 2008) was a Swedish runner. He competed in the 5000 m and 10000 m events at the 1948 and 1952 Olympics and finished in 3–12 place, winning a bronze medal in the 10000 m in 1948. Albertsson won eight national titles: in the 5000 m in 1947, 1949 and 1951–53, and in the 10000 m in 1948, 1950 and 1954.

References

1921 births
2008 deaths
Sportspeople from Uppsala
Swedish male long-distance runners
Olympic bronze medalists for Sweden
Athletes (track and field) at the 1948 Summer Olympics
Athletes (track and field) at the 1952 Summer Olympics
Olympic athletes of Sweden
Medalists at the 1948 Summer Olympics
Olympic bronze medalists in athletics (track and field)